Ellen Cheever (1949 – February 12, 2021) was an American interior designer and kitchen historian.

She played a critical role in establishing the fields of kitchen and bathroom design.

Cheever died in February 2021, in Wilmington, Delaware.

References 

American interior designers
1949 births
2021 deaths
People from Wilmington, Delaware
Date of birth missing
Place of birth missing